Glendowie is a suburb in Auckland, New Zealand. It is under the local governance of Auckland Council. It was under Auckland City Council from 1989 until the merger of all of Auckland's councils into the "super city" in 2010.

Location
Glendowie is located on the north-eastern extent of the Auckland isthmus. Its northern and eastern boundaries are defined by the Waitematā Harbour and the Tamaki Estuary.

The suburbs exhibit an affluent suburban residential character.

History 
Historically, the area of Glendowie around Taylors Hill was a forest of mostly puriri trees. The eastern edge of Glendowie bordering the Tāmaki River was called Tauoma, and was the Eastern edge of the area settled by Te Waiohua, the largest settlement of which was called Te Taurere (located at Taylors Hill). Around 1750, Ngāti Whātua expanded their territory further into Tāmaki Makaurau, and gifted the land to Ngāti Pāoa in the late 1700s.

The suburb of Glendowie was established in the 1920s, when George Riddell created a loop road through the area. It takes its name from one of the much earlier Taylor Brothers' farm estates, Glen Dowie, owned by Richard James Taylor. Two of his brothers also had farms in this area and built houses,; Charles John Taylor at Glen Orchard (now St. Heliers) and William Innes Taylor at Glen Innes (gave its name to the suburb Glen Innes). Their brother, Allen Kerr Taylor, lived near Mount Albert in a house called Alberton.

Demographics

Glendowie had a population of 8,832 at the 2018 New Zealand census, an increase of 381 people (4.5%) since the 2013 census, and an increase of 861 people (10.8%) since the 2006 census. There were 2,877 households, comprising 4,359 males and 4,476 females, giving a sex ratio of 0.97 males per female, with 1,932 people (21.9%) aged under 15 years, 1,515 (17.2%) aged 15 to 29, 3,987 (45.1%) aged 30 to 64, and 1,398 (15.8%) aged 65 or older.

Ethnicities were 81.0% European/Pākehā, 4.8% Māori, 3.7% Pacific peoples, 15.0% Asian, and 3.6% other ethnicities. People may identify with more than one ethnicity.

The percentage of people born overseas was 36.2, compared with 27.1% nationally.

Although some people chose not to answer the census's question about religious affiliation, 44.6% had no religion, 44.4% were Christian, 0.2% had Māori religious beliefs, 1.2% were Hindu, 1.4% were Muslim, 1.3% were Buddhist and 1.9% had other religions.

Of those at least 15 years old, 2,886 (41.8%) people had a bachelor's or higher degree, and 576 (8.3%) people had no formal qualifications. 2,268 people (32.9%) earned over $70,000 compared to 17.2% nationally. The employment status of those at least 15 was that 3,324 (48.2%) people were employed full-time, 1,149 (16.7%) were part-time, and 204 (3.0%) were unemployed.

Education

Apart from Sacred Heart, all of these schools are co-educational. Rolls are as of

Sports clubs 
Glendowie has a tennis club, bowls club and taekwondo club, all located adjacent to Churchill Park. The Eastern Suburbs soccer club and Bayside Westhaven baseball clubs hold matches at Crossfield Reserve.

Notable residents 
Graeme Hart, businessman
Don Brash, former New Zealand leader of the opposition (National Party 2003–2006)

Further reading
 Delving into The Past Of Auckland's Eastern Suburbs; Section 6, St.Heliers, Elizabeth T. Jackson

References

External links
Photographs of Glendowie held in Auckland Libraries' heritage collections.

Suburbs of Auckland
Populated places on the Tāmaki River
Ōrākei Local Board Area